Istgah-e Rah Ahan-e Shush (also Romanized as Īstgāh-e Rāh Āhan-e Shūsh; also known as Istgahé Shoosh and Īstgāh-e Shūsh) is a village in Hoseynabad Rural District, in the Central District of Shush County, Khuzestan Province, Iran. At the 2006 census, its population was 117, in 22 families.

Transport
As for its name, meaning "Shush Railway Station" in Persian, the village is the seat of the station of Shush.

References

Populated places in Shush County
Railway stations in Iran